Johnny Smith and Poker-Huntas is a 1938 Warner Bros. Merrie Melodies series directed by Tex Avery and written by Rich Hogan. The short was released on October 22, 1938 and features an early version of Elmer Fudd.

In the cartoon, Prototype-Elmer Fudd plays Johnny Smith, a caricature of the colonist Captain John Smith, who arrives on the Mayflower to be met by some sarcastic Native Americans as he makes his escape with Poker-Huntas, a caricature of Pocahontas, and makes off to England with her to raise a family.

Historical accuracy
The cartoon contains many historical distortions apart from the anachronisms normally expected in such a deliberate farce. The real Captain Smith, who arrived in present-day Virginia in 1607, was totally unconnected with the Mayflower, which disembarked at Massachusetts Bay in 1620. No actual romance ever existed between him and Pocahontas, who married John Rolfe.

References

External links
 Johnny Smith and Poker-Huntas at the Big Cartoon Database
 

1938 animated films
1938 films
Films directed by Tex Avery
Merrie Melodies short films
Warner Bros. Cartoons animated short films
American black-and-white films
Cultural depictions of Pocahontas
1930s Warner Bros. animated short films
Films about Native Americans
Elmer Fudd films
1930s English-language films